is the second solo single by Misaki Iwasa. It was released on January 9, 2013 and reached the fifth place on the Oricon weekly singles chart.

References

2013 singles
Japanese-language songs
Misaki Iwasa songs